"Conqueror" is a song by British singer Estelle from her fourth studio album, True Romance (2015). The song was released as a single on 22 July 2014 by 1980 Records and BMG. The track was written by Estelle, Claude Kelly, Angel Higgs, Jaramye Daniels, Akil C. King, Kyle Henry, and Bailey Owens. The song was produced by Reefa and Johnny Black. "Conqueror" was featured in the 2014 film Addicted. A version of the song was recorded alongside Jussie Smollett for the 2015 TV series Empire.

Charts

Empire version

References

2014 singles
2014 songs
Empire (2015 TV series)
Estelle (musician) songs
Songs written by Estelle (musician)
Songs written by Claude Kelly